Five Mile River is a community in the Canadian province of Nova Scotia, located in the Municipal District of East Hants in Hants County .

References
Five Mile River on Destination Nova Scotia

Communities in Hants County, Nova Scotia
General Service Areas in Nova Scotia